The Seventeen Provinces were the Imperial states of the Habsburg Netherlands in the 16th century. They roughly covered the Low Countries, i.e., what is now the Netherlands, Belgium, Luxembourg, and most of the French departments of Nord (French Flanders and French Hainaut) and Pas-de-Calais (Artois). Also within this area were semi-independent fiefdoms, mainly ecclesiastical ones, such as Liège, Cambrai and Stavelot-Malmedy.

The Seventeen Provinces arose from the Burgundian Netherlands, a number of fiefs held by the House of Valois-Burgundy and inherited by the Habsburg dynasty in 1482, and held by Habsburg Spain from 1556. Starting in 1512, the Provinces formed the major part of the Burgundian Circle. In 1581, the Seven United Provinces seceded to form the Dutch Republic.

Composition 
After the Habsburg emperor Charles V had re-acquired the Duchy of Guelders from Duke William of Jülich-Cleves-Berg by the 1543 Treaty of Venlo, the Seventeen Provinces comprised:

the County of Artois
the County of Flanders, including the burgraviates of Lille, Douai, Orchies, the Lordship of Tournai and the Tournaisis
the Lordship of Mechelen
the County of Namur
the County of Hainaut
the County of Zeeland
the County of Holland
the Duchy of Brabant, including the Lordship of Breda, the counties of Leuven and of Brussels, and the advocacy of the Abbey of Nivelles and of Gembloux, and the "Overmaas" lands of Brabant (Dalhem, Valkenburg and Herzogenrath)
the Margraviate of Antwerp
the Duchy of Luxembourg
the Lordship of Utrecht
the Lordship of Frisia
the Duchy of Limburg
the Lordship of Groningen (including the Ommelanden)
the Lordship of Overijssel
the Duchy of Guelders with the Lordship of Drenthe, Lingen, Wedde, and Westerwolde
the County of Zutphen
It was not always the same seventeen provinces represented at the Estates-General of the Netherlands. Sometimes, one delegation was included in another.

In later years, the County of Zutphen became a part of the Duchy of Guelders, and the Duchy of Limburg was dependent on the Duchy of Brabant. The Lordship of Drenthe is sometimes considered part of the Lordship of Overijssel. On the other hand, the French-speaking cities of Flanders were sometimes recognised as a separate province.
Therefore, in some lists Zutphen and Drenthe are replaced by 
burgraviates of Lille, Douai, Orchies (also called Walloon Flanders)
Tournai and the Tournaisis

There were a number of fiefdoms in the Low Countries that were not part of the Seventeen Provinces, mainly because they did not belong to the Burgundian Circle, but to the Lower Rhenish-Westphalian Circle. The largest of these was the Prince-Bishopric of Liège, the green area on the map, including the County of Horne. The ethnically and culturally Dutch duchies of Cleves and Julich did not join either. In the north, there were also a few smaller entities like the island of Ameland that would retain their own lords until the French Revolution.

Historians came up with different variations of the list, but always with 17 members. This number could have been chosen because of its Christian connotation.

History

The Seventeen Provinces originated from the Burgundian Netherlands. The dukes of Burgundy systematically became the lords of different provinces. Mary I of Valois, Duchess of Burgundy was the last of the House of Burgundy.

Mary married Maximilian I of Habsburg, Emperor of the Holy Roman Empire in 1477, and the provinces were acquired by the House of Habsburg on her death in 1482, with the exception of the Duchy of Burgundy itself, which, with an appeal to Salic law, had been reabsorbed into France upon the death of Mary's father, Charles the Bold. Maximilian and Mary's grandson, Charles V of Habsburg, Emperor of the Holy Roman Empire and King of Spain, eventually united all 17 provinces under his rule, the last one being the Duchy of Guelders, in 1543.

Most of these provinces were fiefs of the Holy Roman Empire. Two provinces, the County of Flanders and the County of Artois, were originally French fiefs, but sovereignty was ceded to the Empire in the Treaty of Cambrai in 1529.

On 15 October, 1506, in the palace of Mechelen, the future Charles V was recognized as Heer der Nederlanden ("Lord of the Netherlands"). Only he and his son ever used this title. The Pragmatic Sanction of 1549 determined that the Provinces should remain united in the future and inherited by the same monarch.

After Charles V's abdication in 1555, his realms were divided between his son, Philip II of Habsburg, King of Spain, and his brother, Ferdinand I, Holy Roman Emperor. The Seventeen Provinces went to his son, the King of Spain.

Conflicts between Philip II and his Dutch subjects led to the Eighty Years' War, which started in 1568. The seven northern provinces gained their independence as a republic called the Seven United Provinces. They were:

the Lordship of Groningen and of the Ommelanden
the Lordship of Friesland
the Lordship of Overijssel
the Duchy of Guelders (except its upper quarter) and the County of Zutphen
the Prince-Bishopric, later Lordship of Utrecht
the County of Holland
the County of Zeeland

The southern provinces, Flanders, Brabant, Namur, Hainaut, Luxembourg and the others, were restored to Spanish rule due to the military and political talent of the Duke of Parma, especially at the Siege of Antwerp (1584–1585). Hence, these provinces became known as the Spanish Netherlands or Southern Netherlands.

The County of Drenthe, surrounded by the other northern provinces, became de facto part of the Seven United Provinces, but had no voting rights in the Union of Utrecht and was therefore not considered a province.

The northern Seven United Provinces kept parts of Limburg, Brabant, and Flanders during the Eighty Years' War (see Generality Lands), which ended with the Treaty of Westphalia in 1648.

Artois and parts of Flanders and Hainaut (French Flanders and French Hainaut) were ceded to France in the course of the 17th and 18th centuries.

Economy
By the mid-16th century, the Margraviate of Antwerp (Duchy of Brabant) had become the economic, political, and cultural centre of the Netherlands after its capital had shifted from the nearby Lordship of Mechelen to the city of Brussels.

Bruges (County of Flanders) had already lost its prominent position as the economic powerhouse of northern Europe, while Holland was gradually gaining importance in the 15th and 16th centuries.

However, after the revolt of the seven northern provinces (1568), the Sack of Antwerp (1576), the Fall of Antwerp (1584–1585), and the resulting closure of the Scheldt river to navigation, a large number of people from the southern provinces emigrated north to the new republic. The centre of prosperity moved from cities in the south such as Bruges, Antwerp, Ghent, and Brussels to cities in the north, mostly in Holland, including Amsterdam, The Hague, and Rotterdam.

Netherlands

To distinguish between the older and larger Low Countries of the Netherlands from the current country of the Netherlands, Dutch speakers usually drop the plural for the latter. They speak of Nederland in the singular for the current country and of de Nederlanden in the plural for the integral domains of Charles V.

In other languages, this has not been adopted, though the larger area is sometimes known as the Low Countries in English.

The fact that the term Netherlands has such different historical meanings can sometimes lead to difficulties in expressing oneself correctly. For example, composers from the 16th century are often said to belong to the Dutch School (Nederlandse School). Although they themselves would not have objected to that term at that time, nowadays it may wrongly create the impression that they were from the current Netherlands. In fact, they were almost exclusively from current Belgium.

Flanders 
The same confusion exists around the word Flanders. Historically, it applied to the County of Flanders, corresponding roughly with the present-day provinces of West Flanders, East Flanders and French Flanders. However, when the Dutch-speaking population of Belgium sought more rights in the 19th century, the word Flanders was reused, this time to refer to the Dutch-speaking part of Belgium, which is larger and contains only part of the old county of Flanders (see Flemish Movement). Therefore, the territory of the County of Flanders and that of present-day Flanders do not fully match:
French Flanders belonged to the County of Flanders, but is today part of France.
Zeelandic Flanders belonged to the County of Flanders, but is today part of the Netherlands.
Tournai and the Tournaisis was some period considered as part of the County of Flanders, but is today part of Wallonia.
 The present-day Belgian province of Flemish Brabant belongs to present-day Flanders, but was part of the Duchy of Brabant.
 The present-day Belgian province of Antwerp belongs to present-day Flanders, but was part of the Duchy of Brabant.
 The present-day Belgian province of Limburg belongs to present-day Flanders, but was part of the Prince-Bishopric of Liège.

This explains, for instance, why the province of East Flanders is not situated in the east of present-day Flanders.

Coats of arms

The States General of the Netherlands had itself its coat, a red shield with an armed golden lion.

See also
Governors of the Habsburg Netherlands
The Netherlands (disambiguation)
Burgundian Netherlands
Pan-Netherlands
French Flemish
Benelux
Armorial of the leading Netherlands Nobles (fr)

References

External links

 Map of the Seventeen Provinces (1555)

 
.
Former polities in the Netherlands
Early Modern Luxembourg
Historical regions
States of the Holy Roman Empire
1540s in the Habsburg Netherlands
1550s in the Habsburg Netherlands
1560s in the Habsburg Netherlands
1570s in the Habsburg Netherlands
1580s in the Habsburg Netherlands
States and territories established in 1549
States and territories disestablished in 1581
1549 establishments in the Holy Roman Empire
1581 establishments in the Holy Roman Empire
16th-century establishments in the Habsburg Netherlands